HMS L4 was a L-class submarine built for the Royal Navy during World War I. The boat survived the war and was sold for scrap in 1934.

Design and description
The L-class boats were enlarged and improved versions of the preceding E class. They displaced  on the surface and  submerged. The L-class submarines had a crew of 35 officers and ratings.

For surface running, the boats were powered by two 12-cylinder Vickers  diesel engines, each driving one propeller shaft. When submerged each propeller was driven by a  electric motor. They could reach  on the surface and  underwater.

The boats were armed with a total of six 18-inch (45 cm) torpedo tubes. Four of these were in the bow and the remaining pair in broadside mounts. They carried 10 reload torpedoes, all for the bow tubes. They were also armed with a  deck gun.

Construction and career

HMS L4 was built by Vickers, Barrow. She was laid down on 21 June 1916 and was commissioned on 26 December 1918. She sailed with the Submarine Depot Ship HMS Ambrose (1903) to Hong Kong in 1919 as part of the 4th Submarine Flotilla, arriving there in January 1920. On 20 October 1927 off Hong Kong, L4 and  rescued crew of the merchant ship SS Irene from a pirate attack after firing her deck gun. HMS L4 was sold on 24 February 1934 and then broken up in Charlestown, Fife.

Notes

References
 
 
 
 

 

British L-class submarines
Ships built in Barrow-in-Furness
1917 ships
World War I submarines of the United Kingdom
Royal Navy ship names
Maritime incidents in 1927